is a Japanese politician of the Democratic Party of Japan, a member of the House of Councillors in the Diet (national legislature).

Overview 

A native of Kashihara, Nara and graduate of Kansai University, he was elected for the first time in 2004.

References

External links 
 Official website in Japanese.

1962 births
Living people
People from Kashihara, Nara
Members of the House of Councillors (Japan)
Democratic Party of Japan politicians
Kansai University alumni